Eddie Picnic's All Wet is a live EP by American rock band AFI. It was recorded on December 29, 1993 during a show at The Phoenix Theater in Petaluma, California and released on March 18, 1994 through Key Lime Pie Records. 201 copies were produced on pink vinyl for its first pressing. The second pressing was limited to 100. A reissue, featuring slightly different artwork and remastered tracks, was announced in 2015 and released in 2016 after a pressing delay. The reissue was handled by Atom Age Industries, a company owned by former AFI bassist Geoff Kresge.

Tracks 1, 2 and 4 were later re-recorded for AFI's debut studio album Answer That and Stay Fashionable. Tracks 3, 5 were re-recorded too and became vinyl-only bonus tracks on Very Proud of Ya.

Track listing

Personnel 
Credits adapted from liner notes.

 Adam Carson – drums, vocals
 Davey Havok – vocals
 Geoff Kresge – bass, vocals, layout 
 Robert Maniaci – engineer
 Markus Stopholese – guitar

Release history

References

AFI (band) albums
1994 live albums